Ramón Villeda Bermúdez (10 May 1937, Santa Rosa de Copán – 20 July 2012) was a Honduran veterinarian and Liberal Party politician. He has held several important positions in administration, including President of the Banco Nacional de Desarrollo Agrícola
(1998-2000) and Vice President of the Congreso Nacional de Honduras (2004-2005) and President of the Banco Central de Honduras from 2010 until his death in 2012.

References

1937 births
2012 deaths
Deputies of the National Congress of Honduras
Honduran veterinarians
Liberal Party of Honduras politicians
People from Santa Rosa de Copan
Presidents of the Central Bank of Honduras